Koruk Chutur (also Romanized as Korūk Chūtūr; also known as Chūtūr Korūk, Korūk, and Qūryūg) is a village in Zavkuh Rural District, Pishkamar District, Kalaleh County, Golestan Province, Iran. At the 2006 census, its population was 335, in 67 families.

References 

Populated places in Kalaleh County